The German Mining Museum in Bochum or DBM is one of the most visited museums in Germany with around 365,700 visitors per year (2012). It is the largest mining museum in the world, and a renowned research establishment for mining history.

Above-ground exhibitions, and a faithfully reconstructed show mine below the museum terrain give visitors insights into the world of mining.  The main areas of research by the scientists are the History and Technology of Mining (Geschichte und Technik des Montanwesens), and the Documentation and Conservation of Cultural Artefacts (Dokumentation und Schutz von Kulturgut).  As a research institute, the museum is a member of the Gottfried Wilhelm Leibniz Scientific Community.

Literature
Olaf Hartung: Museen des Industrialismus: Formen bürgerlicher Geschichtskultur am Beispiel des Bayerischen Verkehrsmuseums und des Deutschen Bergbaumuseums. Cologne [et al.] 2007 (Beiträge zur Geschichtskultur; Bd. 32), Also: Kiel, Univ., Diss., 2007, .
Rainer Slotta (ed.): 75 Jahre Deutsches Bergbau-Museum Bochum (1930 bis 2005). Vom Wachsen und Werden eines Museums. 2 vols., Bochum, 2005, 
Evelyn Kroker: Das Bergbau-Archiv Bochum und seine Bestände. Bochum, 2001.

See also
History of the Ruhr

References

External links

www.BergbauMuseum.de — website of the German Mining Museum, Bochum
VFKK.de — Vereinigung der Freunde von Kunst und Kultur im Bergbau e.V., Bochum 
Schätze der Anden - Chiles Kupfer für die Welt (8 May 2011 to 19 February 2012) 
Description of this anchor point as part of the Route of Industrial Culture
Deutsches Bergbaumuseum – Geschenkt: Das kleine Schwarze , RuhrNachrichten.de, 13 January 2011, Ronny von Wangenheim 

Leibniz Association
Mining museums in Germany
Economy of North Rhine-Westphalia
Bochum
Museums established in 1930
1930 establishments in Germany